The 1984–85 season was Chelsea Football Club's seventy-first competitive season. With 24 goals, Kerry Dixon was the First Division's top goalscorer (jointly with Gary Lineker), the first Chelsea player to do this since Jimmy Greaves in 1961.

Table

Notes

References

External links
 1984–85 season at stamford-bridge.com

1984–85
English football clubs 1984–85 season